Joe Kendall may refer to:

Joe Kendall (American football) (1909–1965), American football player
Joe Kendall (rugby league) (1882–1958), Australian rugby league footballer
Elton Joe Kendall (born 1954), American judge

See also
Jo Kendall (1938–2022), British actress
Joseph Kendall (disambiguation)